Fletcherana roseata is a moth of the family Geometridae. It was first described by Otto Herman Swezey in 1913. It is endemic to the island of Hawaii.

External links

Larentiinae
Endemic moths of Hawaii